The California Courts of Appeal are the state intermediate appellate courts in the U.S. state of California. The state is geographically divided along county lines into six appellate districts. The Courts of Appeal form the largest state-level intermediate appellate court system in the United States, with 106 justices.

Jurisdiction and responsibility

The decisions of the Courts of Appeal are binding on the California superior courts, and both the Courts of Appeal and the superior courts are bound by the decisions of the Supreme Court of California. Notably, all published California appellate decisions are binding on all trial courts. This is distinct from the practice in the federal courts and in other state court systems in which trial courts are bound only by the appellate decisions from the particular circuit in which it sits, as well as the Supreme Court of the United States or the state supreme court.  In contrast, "there is no horizontal stare decisis in the California Court of Appeal"; Court of Appeal decisions are not binding between divisions or even between panels of the same division.  

Thus, all superior courts (and hence all litigants) are bound by the decision of a Court of Appeal if it is the only published California precedent that articulates a point of law relevant to a particular set of facts, even if the superior court would have decided differently if writing on a fresh slate. However, another Court of Appeal division or district may rule differently on that point of law after a litigant seeks relief from an adverse trial court ruling that faithfully applied existing precedent.  In that instance, all superior courts are free to pick and choose which precedent they wish to follow until the state supreme court settles the issue for the entire state, although a superior court confronted with such a conflict will normally follow the view of its own Court of Appeal (if it has already taken a side on the issue). 

It is customary in federal courts and other state courts to indicate in case citations the particular circuit or district of an intermediate appellate court that issued the decision cited. But because the decisions of all six California appellate districts are equally binding upon all trial courts, district numbers are traditionally omitted in California citation style unless an actual interdistrict conflict is at issue.

All California appellate courts are required by the California Constitution to decide criminal cases in writing with reasons stated (meaning that even in criminal appeals where the defendant's own lawyer has tacitly conceded that the appeal has no merit, the appellate decision must summarize the facts and law of the case and review possible issues independently before concluding that the appeal is without merit). Such procedure is not mandated for civil cases, but for certain types of civil cases where a liberty interest is implicated, the Courts of Appeal may, but are not required to, follow a similar procedure. Most Court of Appeal opinions are not published and have no precedential value; the opinions that are published are included in the official reporter, California Appellate Reports.   

In addition, West Publishing traditionally included Court of Appeal opinions in its unofficial reporter, the Pacific Reporter.  In 1959, West began publishing both Supreme Court and Court of Appeal opinions in West's California Reporter, and no longer included Court of Appeal opinions in the Pacific Reporter.

Due to their huge caseloads and volume of output, the Courts of Appeal in turn see the largest number of decisions appealed to the state supreme court and the Supreme Court of the United States. A few famous U.S. Supreme Court cases, such as Burnham v. Superior Court of California, came to the high court on writ of certiorari to one of the Courts of Appeal after the state supreme court had denied review. Many Court of Appeal opinions have become nationally prominent in their own right, such as the 1959 opinion that carved out the first judge-made exception to the at-will employment doctrine, the 1980 opinion that authorized a cause of action for wrongful life, and the 1984 opinion that created the right to Cumis counsel.

History
The California Constitution originally made the Supreme Court the only appellate court for the whole state. As the state's population skyrocketed during the 19th century, the Supreme Court was expanded from three to seven justices, and then the Court began hearing the majority of appeals in three-justice panels. The Court became so overloaded that it frequently issued summary dispositions in minor cases, meaning that it was merely saying "affirmed" or "reversed" without saying why. The state's second Constitution, enacted in 1879, halted that practice by expressly requiring the Court to issue every dispositive decision in writing "with reasons stated." In 1889, the Legislature authorized the Supreme Court to appoint five commissioners to help with its work.

Despite implementing all these measures, the Supreme Court was no longer able to keep up with the state's rapidly growing appellate caseload by the end of the 19th century. Accordingly, in 1903, the Legislature proposed a constitutional amendment to create what were then called the District Courts of Appeal. On November 8, 1904, the electorate adopted the amendment.

The District Courts of Appeal originally consisted of three appellate districts, headquartered in San Francisco, Los Angeles, and Sacramento, with three justices each. These first nine justices were appointed by the Governor. Each district was assigned an ordinal number (i.e., first, second, and third).  The first nine justices included the five members of the Supreme Court Commission, which had been simultaneously abolished by the same constitutional amendment. 

In 1966, the word "District" was dropped from the official names of the Courts of Appeal by another constitutional amendment which extensively revised the sections governing the state judiciary.  This left Florida as the sole state in the United States with "District Courts of Appeal." Since then, each of the Courts of Appeal has been named officially as "the Court of Appeal of the State of California" for a particular numbered appellate district.

Appointment, retention, and removal 
Originally, after appointment by the Governor incumbents ran in potentially contested head-to-head elections.  However, after a particularly bitter contest in 1932, the California Constitution was amended to provide for the present retention election system, where the voters are given the choice to retain or reject a candidate.  To date no incumbent has been denied retention. 

To fill a vacant position, the Governor must first submit a candidate's name to the Commission on Judicial Nominees Evaluation of the State Bar of California, which prepares and returns a thorough confidential evaluation of the candidate.  Next, the Governor officially nominates the candidate, who must then be evaluated by the Commission on Judicial Appointments, which consists of the Chief Justice of California, the Attorney General of California, and a senior presiding justice of the Court of Appeal. The Commission holds a public hearing and if satisfied with the nominee's qualifications, confirms the nomination, which enables the nominee to be sworn in and begin serving immediately.

All nominees must have been members of the State Bar of California for at least 10 years preceding their nomination. Typical nominees include experienced attorneys in private practice, current superior court judges, and current federal district judges. Some nominees have taught as adjunct professors or lecturers in law schools, but tenured professors are extremely rare. Another path to the Courts of Appeal is to work for the Governor, especially as appointments secretary, cabinet secretary, or legal affairs secretary.  

Terms of both Court of Appeal and Supreme Court justices are 12 years.  However, if a nominee is confirmed to an existing seat partway through a term, the nominee can only serve the remaining period of the term before standing for election.  All California appellate justices must undergo retention elections every 12 years at the same time as the general gubernatorial election, in which the sole question is whether to retain the justice for another 12 years.  If a majority votes "no," the seat becomes vacant and may be filled by the Governor.  While Supreme Court justices are voted on by the entire state, Court of Appeal justices are voted on only by the residents of their districts.

Like all other California judges, Court of Appeal justices are bound by the California Code of Judicial Conduct and can be removed prior to the expiration of their terms by the Commission on Judicial Performance.  In order to protect judicial independence (and because the losing party to a lawsuit will almost always regard the judge who ruled against them to be incompetent or biased), the CJP generally only initiates removal proceedings in cases of severe or extensive judicial misconduct.

Organization

When there is a vacancy on the Supreme Court of California, or if a Supreme Court justice recuses themself from a case, a Court of Appeal justice is temporarily assigned to hear each Supreme Court case requiring such assignment. When there are vacancies on the Court of Appeal, the Chief Justice of the Supreme Court temporarily assigns a judge from the superior court or a retired justice of the Court of Appeal to sit as a Court of Appeal justice.

Some of the appellate districts (First and Second) are divided into divisions that have four appellate justices, who are randomly selected to form three-justice panels for each appellate case, and whose workloads are divided semi-randomly to ensure even division of work. Some of the appellate districts (Third, Fifth, and Sixth) are not divided into divisions; for each appellate case, three-justice panels are semi-randomly drawn, again to ensure even division of work. The Fourth District is unique in that it is divided into three geographically-based divisions that are administratively separate, each of which works much like the Third, Fifth, and Sixth Districts. When the presiding justice of a district or division is part of the three-justice panel, they serve as the presiding justice on the case. When the presiding justice is not part of the three-justice panel, the senior justice of the three-justice panel serves as the acting presiding justice on the case.

The First, Second, and Third Districts each have one big courtroom at their main courthouses which they share with the Supreme Court of California. Therefore, on a typical weekday, the courtrooms of those districts will have three Court of Appeal justices seated at an extra-wide bench large enough to accommodate the seven justices of the Supreme Court.

Unlike the federal courts of appeals, the state Courts of Appeal have no provision allowing rehearing of cases en banc by all justices of a district (or a division in the case of the Fourth District). If a conflict becomes evident between published opinions of different panels or divisions of the same district, and the newer opinion creating the conflict is not immediately appealed to the Supreme Court of California or depublished by that court, the conflict will simply persist until the high court reaches the issue in a future case.

Each court of appeal is led by an administrative presiding justice (APJ).  In courts of appeal with divisions, the Chief Justice of California may designate the presiding justice of one division as the APJ, while in courts of appeal without divisions, the presiding justice is also the APJ.  As the title implies, the APJ is responsible for managing the court's personnel, operations, caseload, budget, and facilities.

First District

The California Court of Appeal for the First District is one of the first three appellate districts created in 1904 and is located in San Francisco. Its jurisdiction is over the following counties: Alameda, Contra Costa, Del Norte, Humboldt, Lake, Marin, Mendocino, Napa, San Francisco, San Mateo, Solano, and Sonoma. It is divided into five non-geographical divisions with four justices each:

Division One:
 Jim Humes, Administrative Presiding Justice
 Sandra L. Margulies, Associate Justice
 Kathleen M. Banke, Associate Justice
 (Vacant), Associate Justice

Division Two:
 (Vacant), Presiding Justice
 James A. Richman, Associate Justice
 Theresa M. Stewart, Associate Justice
 Marla J. Miller, Associate Justice

Division Three:
 Alison M. Tucher, Presiding Justice
 Carin T. Fujisaki, Associate Justice
 Ioana Petrou, Associate Justice
 Victor Rodriguez, Associate Justice

Division Four:
 (vacant), Presiding Justice
 Jon B. Streeter, Associate Justice
 Tracie L. Brown, Associate Justice
 Jeremy M. Goldman, Associate Justice

Division Five:
 Teri L. Jackson, Presiding Justice
 Mark B. Simons, Associate Justice
 Gordon B. Burns, Associate Justice
 (Vacant), Associate Justice

Second District

The California Court of Appeal for the Second District is one of the first three appellate districts created in 1904 and has its main courthouse in Los Angeles and the secondary courthouse, hosting Division Six, in Ventura. Division Six handles appeals from San Luis Obispo, Santa Barbara, and Ventura Counties, while Divisions One through Five, Seven, and Eight handle appeals from Los Angeles County. Each division has four justices.

Division One:
 Frances Rothschild, Presiding Justice
 Victoria Gerrard Chaney, Associate Justice
 Helen I. Bendix, Associate Justice
 Gregory J. Weingart, Associate Justice

Division Two:
 Elwood Lui, Administrative Presiding Justice
 Judith M. Ashmann-Gerst, Associate Justice
 Victoria M. Chavez, Associate Justice
 Brian M. Hoffstadt, Associate Justice

Division Three:
 Lee Ann Edmon, Presiding Justice
 Luis A. Lavin, Associate Justice
 Anne H. Egerton, Associate Justice
 (vacant), Associate Justice

Division Four:
 Nora Margaret Manella, Presiding Justice
 Thomas L. Willhite, Jr., Associate Justice
 Audrey B. Collins, Associate Justice
 Brian S. Currey, Associate Justice

Division Five:
 Laurence D. Rubin, Presiding Justice
 Lamar W. Baker, Associate Justice
 Carl H. Moor, Associate Justice
 Dorothy C. Kim, Associate Justice

Division Six:
 Arthur Gilbert, Presiding Justice
 Kenneth R. Yegan, Associate Justice
 Hernaldo J. Baltodano, Associate Justice
 (vacant), Associate Justice

Division Seven:
 Dennis M. Perluss, Presiding Justice
 John L. Segal, Associate Justice
 Gail Ruderman Feuer, Associate Justice
 (vacant), Associate Justice

Division Eight:
 Maria E. Stratton, Presiding Justice
 Elizabeth A. Grimes, Associate Justice
 John Shepard Wiley, Jr., Associate Justice
 Victor Viramontes, Associate Justice

Third District

The California Court of Appeal for the Third District is one of the first three appellate districts created in 1904 and is located in Sacramento. Its jurisdiction is over the following counties: Alpine, Amador, Butte, Calaveras, Colusa, El Dorado, Glenn, Lassen, Modoc, Mono, Nevada, Placer, Plumas, Sacramento, San Joaquin, Shasta, Sierra, Siskiyou, Sutter, Tehama, Trinity, Yolo, and Yuba. It has 11 justices and is not divided into divisions.

Justices:
 (Vacant), Administrative Presiding Justice
 Harry Hull, Associate Justice
 Ronald B. Robie, Associate Justice
 Louis R. Mauro, Associate Justice
 Elena J. Duarte, Associate Justice
 Jonathan K. Renner, Associate Justice
 Peter A. Krause, Associate Justice
 Laurie M. Earl, Associate Justice
 Stacy E. Boulware Eurie, Associate Justice
 (Vacant), Associate Justice
 (Vacant), Associate Justice

Fourth District
The California Court of Appeal for the Fourth District is unique in that it is divided into three geographical divisions that are administratively separate, which even have different case number systems, and yet remain referred to as a single district.

Division One

The Division One courthouse is located in San Diego. It handles appeals from Imperial and San Diego Counties. It has 10 justices.

Justices:
 Judith McConnell, Administrative Presiding Justice
 Richard D. Huffman, Associate Justice
 Terry B. O'Rourke, Associate Justice
 Cynthia Aaron, Associate Justice
 Joan Irion, Associate Justice
 William Dato, Associate Justice
 Truc T. Do, Associate Justice
 Martin N. Buchanan, Associate Justice
 (vacant), Associate Justice
 (vacant), Associate Justice

Division Two

The Division Two courthouse is located in Riverside. It handles appeals from Inyo, Riverside, and San Bernardino Counties. It currently has eight justices.

Justices:
 Manuel A. Ramirez, Presiding Justice
 Art W. McKinster, Associate Justice
 Douglas P. Miller, Associate Justice
 Carol D. Codrington, Associate Justice
 Marsha G. Slough, Associate Justice
 Richard T. Fields, Associate Justice
 Michael J. Raphael, Associate Justice
 Frank J. Menetrez, Associate Justice

Division Three

The Division Three courthouse is located in Santa Ana. It handles appeals from Orange County. It has eight justices.

Justices:
 Kathleen E. O'Leary, Presiding Justice
 William W. Bedsworth, Associate Justice
 Eileen C. Moore, Associate Justice
 Thomas M. Goethals, Associate Justice
 Maurice Sanchez, Associate Justice
 Joanne Motoike, Associate Justice
 Thomas Delaney, Associate Justice
 (vacant), Associate Justice

History
The Fourth District was formed by a division of the Second District pursuant to legislation that went into effect on June 5, 1929. The first decision made by the Fourth District was on October 16, 1929, in the case of Mills v. Mills (1929) 101 Cal.App. 248 [281 P. 707].

Originally, appeals from all of Southern California (including the San Joaquin Valley) were heard by the state supreme court sitting in Los Angeles, and then the Second District took over most of that caseload when it was created in 1904. Lawyers from the rest of Southern California outside of Los Angeles County grew tired of having to travel hundreds of miles to and from Los Angeles just to argue appeals. They lobbied for the creation of a Fourth District that would sit at locations closer to them. Three state senators from San Diego, Fresno, and San Bernardino orchestrated the creation of the Fourth District in 1929. As a compromise, the court was created as a "circuit-riding" court that would sit each year in all three of those cities: Fresno (January-April), San Diego (May-August), and San Bernardino (September-December).

In 1961, the Fifth District, with headquarters in Fresno, was created to hear appeals from San Joaquin Valley counties. The Fourth District's remaining territory was still enormous (San Bernardino County is the single largest county in the contiguous United States by area); in 1965, the Fourth District split itself into Division One, sitting permanently in San Diego, and Division Two, sitting permanently in San Bernardino (now Riverside), meaning it would no longer be a circuit-riding court. The two divisions shared jurisdiction over Orange County until the creation of Division Three in 1982.

The Fourth District was the first Court of Appeal to get a custom-built courthouse of its own in January 1999, when Division Two moved from San Bernardino to a newly-built courthouse in Riverside. The First, Second, and Third Districts have always shared courthouses with the Supreme Court, while the Fourth, Fifth, and Sixth Districts at their founding all initially leased space in existing office buildings.

Fifth District

The California Court of Appeal for the Fifth District is located in Fresno. Its jurisdiction covers the following counties: Fresno, Kern, Kings, Madera, Mariposa, Merced, Stanislaus, Tulare, and Tuolumne.  It currently has 10 justices.

Justices:
 Brad R. Hill, Administrative Presiding Justice
 Bert Levy, Associate Justice
 Charles S. Poochigian, Associate Justice
 Jennifer R.S. Detjen, Associate Justice
 Donald R. Franson, Jr., Associate Justice
 Rosendo Peña, Jr., Associate Justice
 M. Bruce Smith, Associate Justice
 Kathleen Meehan, Associate Justice
 Mark W. Snauffer, Associate Justice
 Thomas De Santos, Associate Justice

History
The Fifth District was formed by a division of the Fourth District pursuant to legislation enacted in 1961 (Stats.1961, c. 845, p. 2128, § 7). The first decision made by the Fifth District was on November 21, 1961, in the case of Wheat v. Morse (1961) 17 Cal.Rptr. 226 [197 Cal.App.2d 203].

Sixth District

The California Court of Appeal for the Sixth District is located in the Comerica Bank building in San Jose. Its jurisdiction covers Monterey, San Benito, Santa Clara, and Santa Cruz Counties. It has seven justices.

Justices:
 Mary J. Greenwood, Administrative Presiding Justice
 Patricia Bamattre-Manoukian, Associate Justice
 Adrienne M. Grover, Associate Justice
 Allison M. Danner, Associate Justice
 Cynthia C. Lie, Associate Justice
 Charles E. Wilson, Associate Justice
 Daniel Bromberg, Associate Justice

History
The Sixth District was formed by a division of the First District pursuant to legislation enacted in 1981 (Stats.1981, c. 959, p. 3645, § 5). The first decision made by the Sixth District was on December 13, 1984, in the case of People v. Dickens (1984) 163 Cal.App.3d 377 [208 Cal.Rptr. 751].

See also
 Judiciary of California
 Supreme Court of California
 Court of Appeals
 Districts in California
 California appellate projects

Notes

References

External links
 California Judicial System
 California Appellate Courts
 Appellate Case Information System

California state courts
State appellate courts of the United States
1904 establishments in California
Courts and tribunals established in 1904